Irina Nyberg  (born 1983) is a Russian orienteering competitor. She was born in Novocheboksarsk. She competed at the 2013 World Orienteering Championships in Vuokatti, where she placed fifth in the middle distance, sixth in the relay, and 18th in the sprint. She won a bronze medal in the relay at the 2014 European Orienteering Championships in Portugal, with the Russian team.

References

Russian orienteers
Female orienteers
1983 births
Living people
People from Novocheboksarsk
Sportspeople from Chuvashia
20th-century Russian women
21st-century Russian women